Euwintonius is a harvestman genus in the family Assamiidae, subfamily Dampetrinae. Members of this genus have an unarmoured eye pedicel, scutal areas 1-5 and the first three tergites also being unarmoured. The first scutal area is without a longitudinal groove and the palpal femur has one medial-apical spine..

Etymology
This genus is named after the town of Winton in central west Queensland, Australia, where the first specimen was found.  The type species is Euwintonius continentalis.

List of species
Four species are currently accepted as being members of this genus

Euwintonius bismarckensis Ponting, 2015 from the Bismarck Archipelago
Euwintonius continentalis Roewer, 1923 from Australia
Euwintonius insulanus Roewer, 1940 from New Guinea
Euwintonius thaiensis Suzuki, 1985 from Thailand

References

Harvestmen
Arachnid genera